Valeri Ivanovich Voytenko (born 7 January 1950) is a Russian professional football coach and a former player.

As of 2009, he works as a Professional Football League delegate at the Russian First Division and Russian Second Division matches (he reports the general organization of the game and rates the referees).

External links
 

1950 births
Living people
Soviet footballers
FC Ural Yekaterinburg players
PFC CSKA Moscow players
Russian football managers
FC Ural Yekaterinburg managers
Russian Premier League managers
Association football defenders